Karl-Heinz Munk (born 11 December 1939) is a German ski jumper. He competed in the normal hill and large hill events at the 1964 Winter Olympics.

References

External links
 

1939 births
Living people
German male ski jumpers
Olympic ski jumpers of the United Team of Germany
Ski jumpers at the 1964 Winter Olympics
People from Hochsauerlandkreis
Sportspeople from Arnsberg (region)